is a six episode OVA series developed by the Princess Project creative collective and produced by Animate Film in association with Triangle Staff starting in June 1996 and continuing over a two-year period. Central Park Media licensed the series for North America release in 2000. Following the closure of Central Park Media, the series has been re-licensed to Media Blasters for a 2013 release. The OVA premiered on Toku in the United States in January 2016.

Format & Release
Shamanic Princess''' initial Japanese release was on laserdisc and VHS, in 6 installments. The first episode was released in June 1996, and the last was released in June 1998. It was released on 2 region 2 DVDs starting in 2001.

The show is known partially for its odd chronology: the first 4 episodes properly consist of what fans dub the "Throne of Yord Saga", and the final two episodes cover the happenings that lead up to the Throne of Yord situation.

Plot

The Guardian World lies in another dimension, and its inhabitants are charged with guarding and controlling magical forces. To this end, the inhabitants possess varying levels of magical power which allows them to change shape, destroy objects, suspend time, or call up elemental beings to do their bidding. The source of power in the Guardian World is the Throne of Yord, a mysterious painting watched over by the Elders, who train Neutralizers to tend the Throne and make sure it is kept safe. One of these Neutralizers (Kagetsu) has stolen the Throne and taken it to Earth for an unknown purpose, causing the Elders to send two different teams to Earth to reclaim the Throne—for if the Throne is away for too long or is destroyed, the Guardian World will be undone.

Characters

A member of the Guardian World's royal family, Tiara is an agent charged with retrieving the Throne of Yord. She believes strongly in her duty and is well known as one of the most powerful people in her world: she can both summon elemental beings and transform herself into a demon-like creature with red hair/wings coming from her head. Tiara is hot-tempered and can be abrasive, but she is more innocent and naïve than she likes to let on.

As the story opens, she enrolls in a girls' college and pretends to be an ordinary young woman, as she searches for the powerful Throne of Yord, and her ex-lover Kagetsu. She is angered by Kagetsu's killing of her partner Graham, and by her classmate Lena's assistance of Kagetsu. The fact that Tiara's best friend Sara is inside the Throne of Yord does not initially seem to bother her. But after Kagetsu is badly injured by a mysterious foe, Tiara finds that she has feelings for him still, and isn't sure whether to help him or obey her orders.

When the Throne of Yord overtakes the entire city, Tiara starts fighting its cruel personality, and is forced to reexamine her feelings and her selfish motives. She teams up with Leon, Lena, Kagetsu and Japolo, and manages to bring Sara's kindly personality to the forefront of the Throne.

She, Lena and Kagetsu return the Throne to the Guardian World, and Tiara mentions that she and Kagetsu will be "starting all over" romantically.

Episodes 5-6 show some of Tiara's earlier years, as well as her budding love affair with Kagetsu, and the tempestuous, confusing relationship with her deformed first partner, Graham. She had great difficulty summoning Graham, because he was ensnared by her "shadow demon," until Tiara absorbed her shadow side and gained new power from it.

Though Tiara cared deeply about Graham, she did not return his romantic feelings, and was angered by his hostility towards Kagetsu.

Tiara initially seems very cold, nasty and mocking, as well as indifferent to the possible suffering of her friend Sara, which provokes Lena to rage against her. However, her confusion begins to show as she remembers her love for Sara and Kagetsu, and by the end she has become a much more understanding, warm person.

A small, ferret-like creature, Japolo appears in episodes 1-4, and briefly at the end of Episode 6. He is Tiara's "partner", according to Guardian World terminology, or a creature summoned into the Guardian world to assist Tiara, after the shocking death of her first partner Graham. He has considerable magical power, but doesn't seem to be very strong physically.

Despite his title, Tiara and Japolo are neither peers nor equals. Japolo serves Tiara as a familiar and acts as a battery-pack and backup to her powers. He is highly intelligent, and possesses much knowledge which Tiara doesn't about her mission and why the Throne was stolen. Japolo's powers include being able to freeze time by creating suspension fields (which allows battles to go in crowded cities without anyone noticing), and detecting other magical presences from his world.

Despite his irritation with and frequent criticism of Tiara, Japolo is quite fond of her, and announces that when she's upset, depressed, angry or in an emotional slump, he'll be there to help. Despite their mistresses' fights, he is on friendly terms with Lena's partner Leon. For reasons that are unknown, Japolo has an Eastern European accent in the English dub.

Dead before episode one, Graham has a bronze half-mask on the left side of his face, a wide open left eye, a closed right eye, a large bronze gauntlet on his left arm, and bandages on his other limbs. Graham used his superhuman strength to support Tiara.

Graham is the first "partner" whom Tiara summoned, who appears in episodes 5-6. He was, however, disfigured in the process, and possibly suffered brain damage since talking seems to be difficult for him. Tiara had to fight long in order to possess him, as well as fighting off a demon formed from her own shadow, which now is the demon-like creature she can become in battle. Because of this Graham initially feared Tiara, but his fear soon gives way to a fierce loyalty and romantic love.

Graham feels that Tiara's love for Kagetsu is unhealthy and sees Kagetsu as the source of her pain, though most of those thoughts came from his own affection for her. Graham attacked Kagetsu in the final episode when Kagetsu steals The Throne of Yord (containing the soul of his sister Sara), because the thought of Kagetsu hurting Tiara by leaving enraged Graham. Unable to match Graham's superior physical strength, and about to be strangled to death, Kagetsu "neutralizes" Graham in the struggle.  As Graham's physical form was perpetuated as an extension of Tiara's magic, having Tiara's magics neutralized eradicates Graham's body. He dies speaking Tiara's name.

Lena is a childhood friend of both Sara and Tiara, and later, a rival to Tiara. She uses a flute to perform her magic, summoning vines, ribbons and greenish specters to battle Tiara. Lena is calm and reserved, and while much admired for her accomplishments she harbors feeling of inferiority towards Tiara, partly because Tiara's magic seems to be stronger. With support from the Throne of Yord, she too can become a demon-like creature during battles.

She originally was sent to retrieve the Throne and Kagetsu, but eventually ended up joining him, because of her affection for her childhood friend Sara. She attempted to mislead Tiara, but ended up fighting her on two occasions, enraged that Tiara could so coldly refuse to help her best friend and ex-lover. She was particularly angry when Kagetsu was badly injured by the Throne of Yord, while attempting to save Tiara.

Lena, along with Leon and Kagetsu, is sucked into the Throne of Yord, and she is possessed to fight Tiara. However, she collapses from the Throne's control, and teams up with Tiara to defeat the Throne. At the end, she accompanies Tiara, Leon and Kagetsu back to the Guardian World.

Over the course of the series, Lena reluctantly realized that she is in love with Kagetsu, but does nothing to pursue these feelings, perhaps realizing that Kagetsu is only in love with Tiara.

Leon is Lena's "partner", capable of transforming into a ferocious beast and mirroring Japolo's powers. Leon has a preternatural attachment to Lena and will defend her regardless of the risk to himself. He is only moderately powerful, but Lena can lend him her powers via her flute.

Leon was summoned right around the time the Throne was stolen, and immediately became very attached to "Miss Lena." He accompanies her to our world and assists her in helping Kagetsu, caring more for her wishes than for the orders of the Guardian World. He fights Tiara and her spirit beasts on more than one occasion, but confers with her partner Japolo on friendly terms.

When the Throne sucks Lena and Kagetsu inside itself, Leon is pulled in as well. He ends up being controlled by the Throne, through Lena, and collapses with blood streaming from his eyes during a fight with Tiara. Later, he and Japolo are devoured by the Throne, but both turn up at the end alive and well, and return to the Guardian World with their respective mistresses.

During fights, Leon can be powered up to two levels—he can be enveloped in Lena's vines, making him only slightly more powerful, and he can turn into a white-haired beastlike warrior who is nearly capable of defeating Tiara. He apparently smokes a great deal when stressed, a habit Lena does not like. Leon makes it clear that he would stop if she ordered him to, but asks that she allow him this one vice.

A Neutralizer from the Guardian World, Kagetsu possesses the ability to neutralize other people's magic, but his ability to summon powers of his own is limited. He is able to summon "invisible power" in the form of a small shield, and a neutralizing spirit with the command "Aumkis."

Kagetsu was Tiara's first love, as well as the devoted brother of her best friend Sara. The two fall in love over the course of Tiara's studies, but their relationship became strained after Sara vanished. Kagetsu knew what had happened, since he could hear his sister's voice inside the Throne of Yord, but was unsure what to do. As Kagetsu tried to figure out what to do, he also had to contend with Graham's jealousy. Though Kagetsu tried to be kind to Graham, Graham followed and attacked him while he stole the Throne. Kagetsu was forced to kill Graham as he fled.

He hid out in a small attic room in our world, and joined forces with Lena as they tried to figure out what to do. When Lena was attacked by Tiara, Kagetsu stayed close so he could neutralize Tiara's magic. But when Tiara was attacked by the Throne, Kagetsu tried to rescue her at the cost of his own safety. He was badly injured, but the incident reawakened Tiara's love for him.

During his recovery, Kagetsu was  drawn into the Throne, along with Lena and Leon. He was forcibly bound inside a wall, and forced to watch as his friends and ex-lover fought one another under the Throne's influence. After the Throne defeated Lena and Tiara both, Kagetsu broke free and confronted the Throne, only to be informed that it wanted to stay with him forever (presumably Sara's influence). It consumes him and possesses him, forcing him to fight Tiara.

Fortunately with Sara's help, Tiara is able to break the malign influence on Kagetsu. Kagetsu has another vision of his sister thanking him—and his friends—for trying to help her, and for letting her be the dominant part of the Throne. Finally at peace, and knowing his sister is happy, Kagetsu returns the Throne and reunites with Tiara. Because he returned it willingly, he is apparently not punished.

Sara is Kagetsu's sister and a Tiara's childhood friend. A sweet, gentle girl with a weak constitution, she has untapped ability as a Neutralizer. She mysteriously disappeared before the Throne of Yord was stolen by her older brother, who could hear her voice coming from the painting.

Unable to handle this, Kagetsu stole the painting and promised Sara he would save her. Sara also appeared in a series of dreams to Tiara, giving her cryptic advice about reality and how to capture her. She doesn't seem particularly worried about what is going on, except for the possibility of causing trouble for others.

It is implied at the conclusion of the "Throne of Yord Saga" (and is indeed the thing that saves Tiara's life) that Sara is and always has been a part of the Throne of Yord, and that she was destined to be joined to it from birth. However, her personality seems to have been submerged under the Throne's  malevolent personality, until Tiara brings her to the forefront. She thanks her friends and brother for helping her, and remains as part of the Throne.

The Throne of Yord is the powerful entity (in the form of a painting) which shaped the Guardian World. It is sentient and exists in what appears to be a world within the painting, as well as the painting itself (it is both world and painting). It enjoys taking the shape of other characters, and is very manipulative of some of the characters. It is a lonely being, which is why it takes Sara in as part of its being.

Music
One of Shamanic Princess' standout features is its unique soundtrack, composed by Yoshikazu Suo. With songs ranging from relaxed chamber orchestra pieces, to synthesizer-driven pieces with rambling melodies and tribal-inspired percussion. Mysterious, moody, and sometimes jarring, the soundtrack complements the atmosphere of the OVA admirably. Notable songs include the opening and ending themes 'Morning of Prayer' (祈りの朝 Inori no Asa) and 'Forest of Memories' (思い出の森 Omoide no Mori) performed by Miwako Saito and the eps.5 ending song, 'Festival of the Wind' (風の祭り Kaze no Matsuri''), performed by the Mongolian singer Wuyontana, which was also performed at eps.6's halfway point.

References

External links
 
 Animerica review
 EX review

1996 anime OVAs
1998 manga
Anime Works
Central Park Media
Drama anime and manga
Magical girl anime and manga